Luca Scribani Rossi (born 29 December 1960 in Rome) is an Italian sport shooter that won a bronze medal at 1984 Summer Olympics.

See also
Italy national shooting team

References

External links
 

Italian male sport shooters
Living people
1960 births
Olympic shooters of Italy
Shooters at the 1984 Summer Olympics
Shooters at the 1988 Summer Olympics
Shooters at the 1992 Summer Olympics
Olympic medalists in shooting
Olympic bronze medalists for Italy
Medalists at the 1984 Summer Olympics